Obesotoma solida is a species of sea snail, a marine gastropod mollusk in the family Mangeliidae.

Description
There seems to be some confusion as to regards the synonyms of this species. Gastropods.com considers Lora quadra Dall, 1919 a synonym, while WoRMS considers Lora quadra a synonym of Oenopota quadra (Dall, 1919).. Forster considers Bela solida Dall, 1887 (and Lora solida Dall, 1921) a synonym of Oenopota solida Dall, 1887, while WoRMS doesn't mention Oenopota solida

Distribution
This marine species occurs in the Sea of Japan and the Bering Sea to Puget Sound.

References

 Hasegawa, K., Okutani, T. and E. Tsuchida (2000) Family Turridae. In: Okutani, T. (ed.), Marine Mollusks in Japan. Tokai University Press, Tokyo, 619–667 (in Japanese).

External links
  Tucker, J.K. 2004 Catalog of recent and fossil turrids (Mollusca: Gastropoda). Zootaxa 682:1–1295.
 Biolib.cz: Obesotoma solida

solida
Gastropods described in 1887